Mine Kill State Park is a  state park located in Schoharie County, New York, United States.  The park is in the southeast part of the Town of Blenheim.

Park description
Mine Kill State Park opened in 1973. It is named for Mine Kill Creek, which runs through a narrow gorge in the park and features the  Mine Kill Falls. The park is located adjacent to the Blenheim-Gilboa Reservoir and its inflow, Schoharie Creek.

Mine Kill offers year-round recreation, including snowmobiling, cross-country skiing, snowshoeing, fishing (trout and walleye), boating, hiking, mountain-biking, and swimming. The park features an Olympic-sized swimming pool, a diving pool, a wading pool, and a bath house. On site, is also a 18-hole disc golf course. Located at the park is a pavilion which may be rented for private parties. There is a playground, numerous picnic tables, and charcoal grills on site.

Among the park's  of trails is a  section of the Long Path.

Starting in 2015, fees for parking and swimming at the park were waived for all visitors. The elimination of the fees was accomplished through an agreement with the New York Power Authority, who will compensate the New York State Office of Parks, Recreation and Historic Preservation $20,000 annually to offset lost revenue. Fees will continue to be charged for camping and picnic shelter reservations.

See also  
 List of New York state parks

References

External links  
 New York State Parks: Mine Kill State Park
 Mine Kill State Park trail map

State parks of New York (state)
Parks in Schoharie County, New York